Finlays Horticulture Association Football Club is an association football club based in Naivasha, Kenya. The club currently competes in the Kenyan National Super League, and plays its home games at the Kingfisher Grounds.

History
The club was formed in 2011 after its owners, the Finlays Horticulture Company, acquired the Homegrown Horticulture Company and former Kenyan Premier League side Homegrown Football Club along with it.

References

External links

Kenyan National Super League clubs
FKF Division One clubs
Football clubs in Kenya
Works association football clubs in Kenya